Loxwood is an electoral ward of Chichester District, West Sussex, England and returns two members to sit on Chichester District Council.

Following a district boundary review, Loxwood was created from the Petworth, Plaistow and Wisborough Green wards in 2019.

Councillors

Election results

* Elected

Notes
Defected to the Greens on 30 July 2019.

References

External links
 Chichester District Council
 Election Maps

Wards of Chichester District